Lieutenant General Sir Richard George Collingwood KBE CB DSO (7 October 1903 – 21 April 1986) was a British Army General during the 1950s.

Military career
Educated at West Downs School, Collingwood was commissioned into the Cameronians (Scottish Rifles) in 1923.

He served during the Second World War, in the Middle East and Burma and was Commander of 23rd Infantry Brigade in Burma in 1945. He went on to be General Officer Commanding 52nd (Lowland) Infantry Division and Lowland District between 1952 and 1955. He then became Commander Singapore District from 1957. In 1958 he became General Officer Commanding-in-Chief of Scottish Command and Governor of Edinburgh Castle; he retired in 1961.

George Collingwood's papers have been archived at Lilburn Tower, his family home in Northumberland.

References

External links
Generals of World War II

|-
 

1903 births
1986 deaths
Knights Commander of the Order of the British Empire
Companions of the Order of the Bath
Companions of the Distinguished Service Order
Cameronians officers
People educated at West Downs School
British Army lieutenant generals
British Army brigadiers of World War II
Military personnel from Northumberland